Sinanodonta woodiana, the Chinese pond mussel, Eastern Asiatic freshwater clam or swan-mussel, is a species of freshwater mussel, an aquatic bivalve mollusk in the family Unionidae, the river mussels.

Distribution
 indigenous in Eastern Asia
 non-indigenous in Europe:
 Austria
 Belgium
 Croatia
 Czech Republic – non-indigenous in Bohemia since 2001, non-indigenous in Moravia since 1996; not evaluated (NE)
 France
 Germany
 Greece
 Hungary
 Italy
 Poland
 Romania
 Serbia 
 Slovakia 
 Spain
 Ukraine
Switzerland
 non-indigenous in some Indonesian islands
 non-indigenous in America:
 Costa Rica
 Dominican Republic

Extirpated in New Jersey US.

Asia
 Myanmar – non-indigenous, firstly reported in 2017

Ecology
Sinanodonta woodiana is a species of East Asian unionid mussel, primarily from the Amur River and Yangtze rivers. The Chinese pond mussel can reach sizes of up to 30 cm and an age of 12–14 years. Yet, they can reproduce in their first year while only 3–4 cm in size.

This large freshwater mussel is a habitat generalist with high silt tolerance. It is established worldwide despite having, like all unionid mussels, an obligatory parasitic stage (glochidium), which must encyst on host fish. The species is a broad host generalist, which can complete its development on all fish species tested, both coinvasive and native. The presence of S. woodiana can seriously influence indigenous unionid populations.

Sinanodonta woodiana'''s great success is attributed to importation and commercialization of Asian carp, its native host. S. woodiana was introduced in Tuscany both inadvertently, and for artificial pearl production. The species is also sold in garden centers as biofiltration for artificial ponds.

Parasites:
 Aspidogaster conchicola'' (Aspidogastrea)

References

External links

Unionidae
Taxa named by Isaac Lea